An ambulance services trust or ambulance trust is an organisation which provide ambulance services within the National Health Services of England and Wales. There are currently 11 ambulance services trusts in England and Wales. Ambulance services in Scotland are run by the Scottish Ambulance Service and in Northern Ireland by the Northern Ireland Ambulance Service Health and Social Care Trust.

The National Ambulance Resilience Unit, which provides support to all the ambulance trusts, was established in summer 2011 and is based in Oldbury, West Midlands.

History

Following consultation, on 1 July 2006 the number of ambulance trusts fell from 29 to 13.  The reduction can be seen as part of a trend dating back to 1974, when English local authorities ceased to be providers of ambulance services. This round of reductions in the number of trusts originated in the June 2005 report "Taking healthcare to the Patient", authored by Peter Bradley, Chief Executive of the London Ambulance Service, for the Department of Health. Most of the trusts followed government office regional boundaries. Exceptions included Staffordshire Ambulance Service (which had a temporary reprieve), the Isle of Wight (where provision remained with the island's primary care trust), South East Coast Ambulance Service, and South Central Ambulance Service. There have been two ambulance services trust mergers since 2006.

Since 2013, the 11 ambulance trusts in England and Wales have been:

In addition, the Isle of Wight NHS Trust, provides ambulance services for the Isle of Wight.

References

National Health Service (England)
NHS Wales